In mathematics, a 3-step group is a special sort of group of Fitting length at most 3, that is used in the classification of CN groups and in the Feit–Thompson theorem. The definition of a 3-step group in these two cases is slightly different.

CN groups

In the theory of CN groups, a 3-step group (for some prime p) is a group such that:

 is a Frobenius group with kernel 
 is a Frobenius group with kernel 

Any 3-step group is a solvable CN-group, and conversely any solvable CN-group is either nilpotent, or a Frobenius group, or a 3-step group.

Example: the symmetric group S4 is a 3-step group for the prime .

Odd order groups

 defined a three-step group to be a group G satisfying the following conditions:
The derived group of G is a Hall subgroup with a cyclic complement Q.
If H is the maximal normal nilpotent Hall subgroup of G, then G⊆HCG(H)⊆G and HCG is nilpotent and H is noncyclic.
For q∈Q nontrivial, CG(q) is cyclic and non-trivial and independent of q.

References

Finite groups